Chinchilla is a village and census-designated place in Scott and South Abington townships, Lackawanna County, Pennsylvania, United States. The CDP's population was 2,098 at the time of the 2010 United States Census. It was known as "Leach's Flats" until supposedly renamed by a female postmaster in the 1880 after her chinchilla-fur shawl. Chinchilla is located in the gorge of Leggetts Creek, which flows southward into the Lackawanna River on the north side of Scranton. Interstate 81, U.S. Route 6/11 and the Norfolk Southern Railroad (former Lackawanna Railroad) use the gorge between Scranton and Clarks Summit. Chinchilla has its own post office, with ZIP Code 18410.

Demographics

References

Census-designated places in Lackawanna County, Pennsylvania
Census-designated places in Pennsylvania
Unincorporated communities in Lackawanna County, Pennsylvania
Unincorporated communities in Pennsylvania